Giuliano Viviani (1581–1640) was a Roman Catholic prelate who served as Bishop of Isola (1639–1640), Titular Bishop of Salona (1629–1639), and Auxiliary Bishop of Ostia-Velletri (1629–1639).

Biography
Giuliano Viviani was born in Pisa, Italy in 1581.
On 19 November 1629, he was appointed during the papacy of Pope Urban VIII as Titular Bishop of Salona and Auxiliary Bishop of Ostia-Velletri.
On 9 December 1629, he was consecrated bishop by Marcello Lante della Rovere, Cardinal-Bishop of Frascati. 
On 2 May 1639, he was appointed during the papacy of Pope Urban VIII as Bishop of Isola.
He served as Bishop of Isola until his death in November 1640.

References

External links and additional sources
 (for Chronology of Bishops) 
 (for Chronology of Bishops)

External links and additional sources
 (for Chronology of Bishops) 
 (for Chronology of Bishops)  

17th-century Italian Roman Catholic bishops
Bishops appointed by Pope Urban VIII
1581 births
1640 deaths